Çiyni is a quarter of the town Kurşunlu, Kurşunlu District, Çankırı Province, Turkey. Its population is 66 (2021).

References

Populated places in Kurşunlu District